Maxim Gullit (born 20 May 2001) is a Dutch professional footballer who plays as a defender for Cambuur.

His father is former professional footballer Ruud Gullit and his mother is socialite Estelle Cruijff, a niece of Ajax and Barcelona legend Johan Cruyff.

Club career
Born in Zaanstad, Gullit was a youth player with Amsterdamsche FC from 2005 to 2017 before joining the academy of AZ Alkmaar, before making his debut with Jong AZ on 22 April 2019 as a 71st-minute substitute for Joris Kramer in a 0–0 draw with FC Twente. He made his debut for the senior team on 29 October 2020 as a 90th-minute substitute for Bruno Martins Indi in a 4–1 victory over Rijeka in the Europa League. On 27 August 2021, Gullit joined newly-promoted Eredivisie side Cambuur on a two-year deal with the option of a third.

International career
Eligible to play for the Netherlands, Suriname and Croatia, Gullit has played for the Netherlands under-19 team.

Personal life
His father is former Netherlands international Ruud Gullit. His mother Estelle Cruijff is the daughter of Henny Cruijff, Johan Cruyff's brother. His maternal grandmother, Jadranka Lokas, is an ethnic Croat from Šibenik.

Career statistics

References

External links
 Career stats - Voetbal International
 
 

2001 births
Living people
Footballers from Zaanstad
Dutch sportspeople of Surinamese descent
Dutch people of Croatian descent
Dutch footballers
Netherlands youth international footballers
Association football defenders
Amsterdamsche FC players
Jong AZ players
Eerste Divisie players